Johnny Hatten Buss (born October 18, 1956) is part-owner and vice president of strategic development of the Los Angeles Lakers in the National Basketball Association (NBA). He previously held positions as president of the Los Angeles Lazers professional indoor soccer team and the Los Angeles Sparks professional women's basketball team. He is the oldest son of former Lakers owner Jerry Buss. After Jerry died in 2013, his 66% controlling ownership of the Lakers passed to his six children via a trust, with each child receiving an equal interest. Buss was previously married to Christy (Curtis) Buss from 1990 to 2015.

References

1956 births
Living people
Los Angeles Lakers executives
Los Angeles Lakers owners